Quepos is a canton in the Puntarenas province of Costa Rica. The head city is in Quepos district.

Toponymy
It was named Aguirre until February 2015, when its name was changed following a vote in the Legislative Assembly.  The name Quepos refers to the Quepoa people who inhabited this area in pre-Columbian and colonial times.

History 
Quepos was created on 30 October 1948 by decree 235.

Geography 
Quepos has an area of  km² and a mean elevation of  metres.

The canton lies along the central Pacific coast between the mouths of the Damas and Barú rivers. The northeastern border runs through high, remote coastal mountain ranges. The county is most famous for being the home of the Manuel Antonio National Park, the most visited national park in Costa Rica.

Districts 
The canton of Quepos is subdivided into the following districts:
 Quepos
 Savegre
 Naranjito

Demographics 

For the 2011 census, Quepos had a population of  inhabitants.

Transportation

Road transportation 
The canton is covered by the following road routes:

References 

Cantons of Puntarenas Province
Populated places in Puntarenas Province